Brandon Leon Jamison (born July 31, 1981, in Hopkins, South Carolina) is a former American football linebacker in the National Football League. He played for the Atlanta Falcons (2006) and the  Carolina Panthers (2006–2007). Jamison played college football at the University of West Georgia.

References

1981 births
Living people
People from Hopkins, South Carolina
Players of American football from South Carolina
American football linebackers
Atlanta Falcons players
Carolina Panthers players